Idaho Vandals basketball may refer to either of the basketball teams that represent the University of Idaho:

Idaho Vandals men's basketball
Idaho Vandals women's basketball